There are at least 10 named lakes and reservoirs in Carroll County, Arkansas.

Lakes
According to the United States Geological Survey, there are no named lakes in Carroll County, Arkansas.

Reservoirs

Beaver Lake, el.  
Brewer Lake, el.  
Eureka Springs City Lake, el.  
Farwell Spider Creek Lake, el.  
Fuller Lake, el.  
Jackson Lake, el.  
Lake Lucerene, el.  
Lake of No Return, el.  
Leatherwood Lake, el.  
Table Rock Lake, el.

See also
 List of lakes in Arkansas

Notes

Bodies of water of Carroll County, Arkansas
Carroll